The AMA Supercross Championship (commercially known as Monster Energy AMA Supercross) is an American motorcycle racing series. Founded by the American Motorcyclist Association (AMA) in 1974, the AMA Supercross Championship races are held from January through early May. Supercross is a variant of motocross which involves off-road motorcycles on a constructed dirt track consisting of steep jumps and obstacles; the tracks are usually constructed inside a sports stadium. The easy accessibility and comfort of these stadium venues helped supercross surpass off-road motocross as a spectator attraction in the United States by the late 1970s.

From 1974 until 2002 and again from 2008 until 2021, the series was the World Championship of the sport. After losing this status, and with respect to the MXGP holding that discipline's worldwide title, the series, along with the AMA Motocross Championship, will form the SuperMotocross World Championship from 2023.

History

The first motocross race held on a race track inside a stadium took place on August 28, 1948, at Buffalo Stadium in the Paris suburb of Montrouge. As the popularity of motocross surged in the United States in the late 1960s, Bill France added a professional motocross race to the 1971 Daytona Beach Bike Week schedule. The 1972 race was held at Daytona International Speedway on a constructed track on the grass surface between the main grandstand and the pit lane. Jimmy Weinert won the 250 class and Mark Blackwell was the winner of the 500 class.

The event that paved the way for constructed, stadium-based motocross events was a 1972 race held in the Los Angeles Memorial Coliseum, promoted by Mike Goodwin and Terry Tiernan, then-president of the AMA, and won by 16-year-old Marty Tripes. It was billed as the "Super Bowl of Motocross" which led to the coining of the term "Supercross." The Super Bowl of Motocross II held the following year was an even greater success and, eventually evolved into the AMA Supercross championship held in stadiums across the United States and Canada.

Originally, each of the AMA Supercross races were promoted by different promoters, most notably Mike Goodwin in the West, Pace Motorsports in the Midwest and Southwest, Super Sports in the East, and Daytona International Speedway, which promotes its own race. In the 1980s, Mickey Thompson Entertainment Group (MTEG) took over the West region. In the 1990s, MTEG went bankrupt and Super Sports sold its business to Pace, which became the primary AMA Supercross promoter (with Daytona continuing to be the one holdout). In 1998, Pace was bought by SFX Entertainment, which was bought in turn by Clear Channel in 2000. The live events division of Clear Channel was split off as Live Nation in 2005, and the motorsports division was sold to Feld Entertainment in 2008, which currently promotes the championship except for the Daytona round, which is promoted by NASCAR Holdings (the owner of the circuit).

While growing consistently since the '70s, the modern Supercross schedule since 1985 has become further compacted. The schedule would run from February to November, with both the "outdoor" (Motocross) and "indoor" (Supercross) schedules coinciding with each other during the year. 
By 1986, the schedule was compacted to a January to June schedule, and in 1998, the series adopted its present format, starting in early January and ending in early May, with races weekly except for Easter weekend (a traditional off-week for motorsport in the United States). In 2000, the present calendar was adopted with the season starting in the Los Angeles area on the Saturday after the first Thursday of January (between January 3–9) and ending with an early May race in Las Vegas, after which the AMA Motocross Championship "outdoor season" begins.

The American Motorcyclist Association awards three Supercross Championships each year. They are the 450cc (was known as 250cc two-stroke), and both an East and West division on the 250cc (was 125cc two-stroke). Supercross racing classifications are governed by the displacement of the motorcycle's engine. They were based on two-stroke engines until 2006, when four-stroke engines replaced two-stroke engines. From 2007 until 2012, a formula nomenclature similar to IndyCar was used, with the 450cc class known as Supercross and 250cc as Supercross Lites. Starting in 2013, the AMA and Feld Motor Sports returned to the traditional nomenclature, based on four-stroke engines: 450cc (known as "MX1" in Europe), and 250cc (also known as "MX2"). The 450cc Champion has always been generally considered to be the most prestigious.

From 2011-2019, the final race of the season, known as the Monster Energy Cup for sponsorship reasons, is held at Sam Boyd Stadium in Las Vegas. A US $1 million purse is available to the rider who wins all three featured races. Ryan Villopoto won the purse at the inaugural event in 2011, as did Marvin Musquin in the 2017 edition, and Eli Tomac in the 2018 race.

Calendar
The AMA series begins in early January and continues until early-May. It consists of 17 rounds in the 450cc Class, and 9 rounds in 250cc West Class and 9 rounds in the 250cc East Class, held in football and baseball stadiums across the US.

Beginning with Anaheim 1 in 2022, the series holds three of its first six races at Angel Stadium before it heads eastwards. The series concludes in Salt Lake City in early May. The East-West Shootouts in 2022 will be in Atlanta and the final Salt Lake round. The series also holds a race in Daytona during Daytona Bike Week.

Event format
Each meet is structured similarly to Short track motor racing with two heat races and a consolation race in each class. In both classes, each heat race is six minutes plus one lap. Each heat features 20 riders (one may have 21 riders depending on qualifying results), with the top nine advancing to the feature. The other 22 riders are relegated to the consolation race, known as the Last Chance Qualifier, which is five minutes plus one lap, with the top four advancing to the final.

In the 450cc class, the highest placed competitor in points, provided he is in the top ten in national points, and has yet to qualify after either heat race or consolation race, will receive a provisional for the feature race. The feature race is 15 minutes plus one lap in the 250cc class, and 20 minutes plus one lap for the 450cc class, with 26 championship points for the race win. At 3 races per year  a three race format is use. The rules are similar to the Monster Energy Cup individual  scoring will determine the overall race winner.

For the season-ending East-West Shootout at Las Vegas for the 250cc class starting in May 2011, each region's top 20 will race in the non-championship event for a 15-minute heat race. Standard rules apply, with the feature race being 10 laps. In 2016, the East-West Shootout became a points-paying round where both regions' champions would be decided in the same feature. Starting in 2018, the combined East-West Shootout will also be held in the middle of the season, at the Indianapolis round.

Starting with the 2012 Season, riders who are in first place in the Series' Points Lead will use the red plate to race in the Series.

If at any point during the Heat Races, LCQs or the Feature Races, that the race is red-flagged within less than 3 laps, the race will be a complete restart. However, if the race is red-flagged with more than 3 laps completed but less than 90% of the total race distance and after a minimum of a 10-minute delay, the race will be a staggered restart with riders lined up from the previous lap they went.

Track
The sport of Supercross is best described as motocross racing that takes place within the confines of a sports stadium. The tracks are typically shorter in length than a standard motocross track. They feature a combination of man-made obstacles such as whoop sections (where riders skim along the tops of multiple bumps), rhythm sections (irregular series of jumps with a variety of combination options), and triple jumps (three jumps in a row that riders normally clear in a single leap of 70 feet or more). Many of the turns have banked berms, but some are flat. It takes roughly five hundred truckloads of dirt to make up a supercross track. Soil conditions can be hard-packed, soft, muddy, sandy, rutted, or any combination thereof.

Television coverage

Current 
In 2023, there are three broadcast partners from the NBC family of networks: NBC, USA Network and Peacock.

Source:

Previous

AMA Supercross Championship winners by year
Between 2008 and 2021 the AMA Supercross Championship was also designated an FIM World Championship. Lost FIM World Championship status in 2022 due to a rebooted world championship.

Statistics

Supercross all time wins list

Source:

Venues

Sources:

Current Venues

Former Venues

World Supercross Championship winners by year

Conceived in 2003; merged with the AMA series prior to the 2008 season until 2021.

See also 

 List of Grand Prix motocross world champions
 List of AMA motocross national champions
 List of Trans-AMA motocross champions
 Outline of motorcycles and motorcycling

References

External links
 AMA Supercross official website  of Feld Motorsports 
 AMA Supercross Championship official website

 
Supercross
Feld Entertainment
Motorcycle off-road racing series
Motorsport competitions in the United States
Motorsport competitions in Canada